Navkat (formerly: Nau or Nov) is a town in Tajikistan located in Sughd Region south-west of Khujand. It is the administrative capital of Spitamen District with a population of 18,700 (1 January 2020 est.).

References

Populated places in Sughd Region